The Doctorate of Medicine and of Philosophy (MD–PhD) is a dual doctoral degree for physician–scientists, combining the professional training of the Doctor of Medicine degree with the research expertise of the Doctor of Philosophy degree; the Ph.D. is the most advanced credential in the United States. Other dual degree programs exist, such as the joint MD–JD degree; both the JD professional degree and the MD are not universally recognized internationally, however. The National Institutes of Health currently provides 50 medical schools with Medical Scientist Training Program grants that support the training of students in MD–PhD programs at these institutions through tuition and stipend allowances. These programs are often competitive, with some admitting as few as two students per academic year. The MCAT score and GPA of MD–PhD matriculants are often higher than MD only matriculants.

Application and admissions 
MD–PhD typically require or prefer candidates who have had a background in research, either under a professor as an undergraduate or have taken at least one gap year to work in a laboratory setting. The application process in addition to a personal statement required for MD-only applications also require two additional essays to describe why an applicant wants to pursue an MD–PhD and an essay describing their research background.

Training programs 
In the United States, MD–PhD degrees can be obtained through dual-degree programs offered at some medical schools. The idea for an integrated training program began at Case Western Reserve University School of Medicine in 1956 and quickly spread to other research medical schools. In 1964, through the Chief of the Office of Program Planning and Evaluation Herbert H. Rosenberg, Ph.D., the National Institutes of Health (NIH) developed a grant to underwrite some universities' MD–PhD programs. This funding was distributed through the Medical Scientist Training Program (MSTP). There are also non-MSTP funded dual-degree programs, which typically provide funding through endowment funds, research assistantships, teaching assistantships, and extramural fellowships).  Non-MSTP funded dual degree programs have more flexibility and can extend to degrees other than the PhD (e.g., JD and MBA degrees).

Admission to a dual degree program is not a requirement to receive MD and PhD degrees. An individual has the option to complete each degree separately through single-degree programs. However, the student is responsible for all medical school tuition and does not receive a stipend during their MD education. Furthermore, since the PhD training is not streamlined with the medical training, students will often take additional years to complete their PhD.

A PhD may also be obtained by physicians during the residency training period. This combined research and graduate-level medical education are offered by a minority of residency programs. This additional education typically extends the residency period by three to four years.

Training structure

Pre-doctoral
Upon matriculating in an MD–PhD program, students will often follow a 2-PhD-2 plan. In this system, students will complete the pre-clinical curriculum of their medical school (2 years), transition into PhD graduate training (3–5 years), and then finally complete clinical rotations (2 years).

Post-doctoral
Upon receiving the MD–PhD dual degree, physician-scientists may choose a variety of career paths. The most common continues to be residency training with additional laboratory training.  However, a physician–scientist may also elect to refuse residency training, thereby having a career essentially akin to a conventional PhD scientist. A physician–scientist may also elect to work in the private sector with no further formal academic clinical nor research training.

Benefits of the dual degree program

Financial compensation
Some  MD–PhD programs (all MSTPs) cover all medical school tuition, provide a stipend, and cover health insurance expenses.

Residency programs
Candidates with MD–PhD dual degrees are favorably looked upon in most residency programs.

Career flexibility

Graduates with an MD–PhD degree are generally qualified for a variety of careers in medicine and medical research. MD students, just as MD–PhD students, are also qualified for a career in medical research given enough post-graduate research experience. The issue is that careers in medicine as an MD, most commonly being a physician, pay significantly more than careers in medical research. Those who graduate MD most often accrue significant financial debt and are incentivize to seek employment as a high-paying physician to pay off debt from undergraduate and MD schooling. MD–PhD graduates nearly always graduate debt free. Thus, MD–PhD students do not have the same economic pressures to seek employment as a physician compared to their MD counterparts, and instead have the economic flexibility to seek out a career in research or any career path that can utilize the unique skills an MD–PhD had acquired over their years of education.

Career paths
The vast majority (over 80%) of MD–PhD graduates eventually choose to enter academia, government, or industry where medical research is a central component of their duties. According to a FASEB study conducted in 2000, graduates of NIH-funded MSTPs make up just 2.5% of medical school graduates each year, but after graduation, account for about one third of all NIH research grants awarded to physicians. Many MD–PhD graduates also practice clinical medicine in their field of expertise.

Notable MD–PhD physician–scientists
 Barry Blumberg – Recipient of the 1976 Nobel Prize in Physiology or Medicine along with Daniel Gajdusek for their work on the human prion disease kuru
 Francis Collins – Director of the National Institutes of Health and former leader of the Human Genome Project
 James DiCarlo – computational neuroscientist and Head of the MIT Department of Brain and Cognitive Sciences
 Alfred G. Gilman – Recipient of the 1994 Nobel Prize in Physiology or Medicine along with Martin Rodbell for their discoveries regarding G-proteins
 Robert Satcher – Physician, chemical engineer, and NASA astronaut who became the first orthopedic surgeon in space during STS-129
 Vilayanur S. Ramachandran – Neuroscientist known for his work in the fields of behavioral neurology and visual psychophysics
 David Satcher – 16th Surgeon General of the United States
 Chi V. Dang – Director of the Abramson Cancer Center of the University of Pennsylvania
 Christopher Duntsch – Neurosurgeon sentenced to life in prison for intentionally botching 32 surgeries that killed two patients and paralyzed two others
 Gregg L. Semenza
 Joseph Ladapo, surgeon-general of Florida

See also
 Doctor of Medicine
 Doctor of Philosophy
 Biomedical scientist
 DPT-MPH
 Association of American Medical Colleges
 American Physician Scientists Association

References

Medicine and philosophy
Doctoral degrees
Dual academic degrees
Medical degrees